Cristo Rey (Spanish, 'Christ the King') may refer to:

Places
 Cristo Rey, Cayo, Belize
 Cristo Rey, Corozal, Belize
 Cristo Rey, Distrito Nacional, Santo Domingo, Dominican Republic

Education
 Colegio Cristo Rey, Asunción, Paraguay
 Cristo Rey Polytechnic Institute, Valladolid, Spain
 Cristo Rey College, Tacna, Peru
 Cristo Rey Network, a network of Jesuit schools in the United States
 Cristo Rey Jesuit High School, Chicago, IL
 Cristo Rey Boston High School, Boston, MA
 Cristo Rey St. Martin College Prep, Waukegan, IL
 Notre Dame Cristo Rey High School, Lawrence, MA
 Cristo Rey New York High School, New York City
 Cristo Rey Kansas City High School, Kansas City, MO
 Cristo Rey High School, Sacramento, CA
 Cristo Rey Jesuit High School, Baltimore, MD
 Holy Family Cristo Rey High School, Birmingham, AL
 Providence Cristo Rey High School, Indianapolis, IN
 Cristo Rey Jesuit High School, Minneapolis, MN
 Don Bosco Cristo Rey High School, Takoma Park, MD
 Cristo Rey Brooklyn High School, Brooklyn, NY
 Detroit Cristo Rey High School, Detroit, MI
 Cristo Rey Jesuit College Preparatory of Houston, Houston, TX
 DePaul Cristo Rey High School, Cincinnati, OH
 Cristo Rey Philadelphia High School, Philadelphia, PA
 Cristo Rey Columbus High School, Columbus, OH
 Cristo Rey San José Jesuit High School, San Jose, CA
 Cristo Rey Atlanta Jesuit High School. Atlanta, GA
 Cristo Rey Jesuit High School Milwaukee, Milwaukee, WI
 Cristo Rey Dallas College Prep, Dallas, TX
 Cristo Rey Tampa High School, Tampa, FL
 Cristo Rey Baton Rouge Franciscan High School, Baton Rouge, LA
 Cristo Rey OKC, Oklahoma City, OK
 Cristo Rey Fort Worth High School, Fort Worth, TX
 Cristo Rey De La Salle East Bay High School, Oakland, CA
 Cristo Rey Richmond High School, Richmond, VA
 Cristo Rey San Diego High School, San Diego, CA

Other uses
 Cristo Rey (film), a 2013 Dominican Republic film
 Cristo Rey (Mexican statue), on Cerro del Cubilete, Mexico
 Cristo Rey (Colombian statue), in Cali, Colombia

See also
Cristo Rei (disambiguation), the Portuguese equivalent
Christ the King (disambiguation)
 Guerrilleros de Cristo Rey, a Spanish far-right paramilitary organization in the 1970s